The Wills Cup is the premiere domestic One Day cricket competition of Pakistan. During the 1996–97 season, in a bid to make the tournament more interesting, the organizers invited a team from Bangladesh to take part. With the Bangladesh national team preparing for the ICC Trophy in Malaysia, the  Bangladesh 'A' side, led by Harunur Rashid took part in the competition. The tourists were eliminated in the 1st round after losing all four of their group games. in addition to their games in the Wills Cup, the tourists also took part in a number of practice games.

Matches

References

National One Day Championship seasons
Wills Cup
Wills Cup